is a professional Japanese baseball player. He plays infielder for the Tokyo Yakult Swallows.  Kawabata won the Central League batting title in 2015 after recording a .336 average.

References

External links

 NPB.com

1987 births
Living people
Japanese baseball players
Nippon Professional Baseball third basemen
Baseball people from Osaka Prefecture
Tokyo Yakult Swallows players
2015 WBSC Premier12 players
People from Kaizuka, Osaka